Cebu Landmasters, Inc., is a Filipino real estate company. It was founded by Jose Soberano III on September 26, 2003. The head office is in Cebu City. It was listed on the Philippine Stock Exchange on June 2, 2017.

References

External links
 

2003 establishments in the Philippines
Companies based in Cebu City
Companies listed on the Philippine Stock Exchange
Real estate companies established in 2003
Real estate companies of the Philippines